M'lita Dolores was born Mary Poole in Mollart Street, Hanley (Stoke-on-Trent) in 1890, and was an accomplished roller skater, trick cyclist, speciality dancer, and comedian. She had a varied career in Variety as a noted character actress, child impersonator, and later made her name in broadcasting. Her big break came when she won a talent contest at the Imperial concert hall, Glass Street (later used as a skating rink), and went on to become a household name in between two world wars.

Career
It was as M'lita Dolores that she became one of the brightest music hall stars of the West End in the 1920s before ending her career in Malta as a radio personality in the 1950s and 1960s.

Notes and references

1. M'Lita's star shone bright - Article from: The Sentinel (Stoke-on-Trent UK) Article date: April 19, 2008.

External links
BFI
Imperial (Stoke-on-Trent)

1890 births
Year of death missing
People from Hanley, Staffordshire
English stage actresses
20th-century English actresses